Ambulyx adhemariusa is a species of moth in the family Sphingidae. It was described by Ulf Eitschberger, Andreas Bergmann and Armin Hauenstein in 2006. It is known from Sichuan in China. A. adhemariusa may be a form of Ambulyx kuangtungensis.

References

Ambulyx
Moths described in 2006
Moths of Asia